The voiced palatal fricative is a type of consonantal sound used in some spoken languages. It is the non-sibilant equivalent of the voiced alveolo-palatal sibilant.

In broad transcription, the symbol for the palatal approximant, may be used for the sake of simplicity.

The voiced palatal fricative is a very rare sound, occurring in only 7 of the 317 languages surveyed by the original UCLA Phonological Segment Inventory Database. In Dutch, Kabyle, Margi, Modern Greek, and Scottish Gaelic, the sound occurs phonemically, along with its voiceless counterpart, and in several more, the sound occurs as a result of phonological processes.

There is also the voiced post-palatal fricative in some languages, which is articulated slightly more back compared with the place of articulation of the prototypical voiced palatal fricative but not as back as the prototypical voiced velar fricative. The equivalent X-SAMPA symbols are j\_- and G_+, respectively.

Especially in broad transcription, the voiced post-palatal fricative may be transcribed as a palatalized voiced velar fricative ( in the IPA, G' or G_j in X-SAMPA).

Features
Features of the voiced palatal fricative:

 The otherwise identical post-palatal variant is articulated slightly behind the hard palate, making it sound slightly closer to the velar .

Occurrence

Palatal

Post-palatal

Variable

See also
 Index of phonetics articles

Notes

References

External links
 

Fricative consonants
Central consonants
Voiced oral consonants
Palatal consonants
Pulmonic consonants